The Virginia House of Delegates election of 1981 was held on Tuesday, November 3. Primary elections were held on September 8, 1981.

The districts were established by the Assembly Act of August 11, 1981 (Acts of Assembly, 1981 Special Session, Chapter 5). They were challenged in Federal District Court, which found the map unconstitutional in Cosner v. Dalton. The Court allowed the 1981 elections to proceed under the August 11, 1981 Act, but for a one-year term only. A new general election would thus be held in November 1982, under a new map.

The 50 multi-member districts, electing 100 delegates in total, were as follows (52, without a 31st or 40th district):

See also 
 1981 United States elections
 1981 Virginia elections
 1981 Virginia gubernatorial election
 1981 Virginia lieutenant gubernatorial election
 1981 Virginia Attorney General election

References 

Virginia
House of Delegates
Virginia House of Delegates elections